John H. Long was the president of the American Chemical Society in 1903. He was born in 1856, and died in 1918.

References 

Presidents of the American Chemical Society
1856 births
1918 deaths
American chemists